Dəcəl (also, Dəjəl, Dazhal, and Dezhal) is a village in the Jabrayil Rayon of Azerbaijan.

References 

Populated places in Jabrayil District